The Homeland First Party (Partido Patria Primero) was a political party in Costa Rica. Funded by PAC’s dissident and motivational speaker Juan José Vargas, the party contested the 2006 general elections with Vargas as presidential candidate and former professional soccer player Evaristo Coronado as deputy candidate. They gain 1.6% of the legislative votes, and 1.1% of the Presidential vote unable to win any seats in the legislature. The party disbanded in March, 2010.

References

Defunct political parties in Costa Rica